Jalna, India may refer to:

 Jalna district
 Jalna city